Pseudojuloides kaleidos, the Kaleidos wrasse or blue-nose wrasse, is a species of saltwater fish. It is an uncommon fish with a distribution in the Indian Ocean including off the Maldives east to Indonesia.

The Kaleidos wrasse reaches  in length. Both sexes begin a brownish pink color with a pale yellow tip on the snout, with males maturing to bright colors within about a week.

References

kaleidos
Fish described in 1995
Fish of Thailand